Inner mitochondrial membrane peptidase subunit 2 (IMMP2L) is an enzyme that in humans is encoded by the IMMP2L gene on chromosome 7. This protein catalyzes the removal of transit peptides required for the targeting of proteins from the mitochondrial matrix, across the inner membrane, into the intermembrane space. IMMP2L processes the nuclear encoded protein DIABLO.

Structure

Gene 

The gene IMMP2L encodes protein inner mitochondrial membrane peptidase subunit 2 in human. The human IMMP2L gene has 18 exons and locates at chromosome band 7q31.

Protein 

The human protein inner mitochondrial membrane peptidase subunit 2 has two isoforms due to alternative splicing. One isoform is 19.7 kDa in size and composed of 175 amino acids. The calculated theoretical pI of this protein isoform is 8.66. The other isoform is 12.3 kDa in size and composed of 110 amino acids. The calculated theoretical pI of this protein isoform is 9.42.

Function 

As a peptidase, this protein catalyzes the removal of transit peptides required for the targeting of proteins from the mitochondrial matrix, across the inner membrane, into the intermembrane space. it is known to process the nuclear encoding DIABLO protein.

Clinical significance 

Tourette's syndrome is a complex neuropsychiatric disorder characterized by multiple motor and phonic tics. In the clinical characterization of a patient with Tourette's, Petek et al. discovered a breakpoint in chromosome region 7q31. Additional characterization identified that IMMP2L, a novel gene coding for the apparent human homologue of the yeast mitochondrial inner membrane peptidase subunit 2, was found to be disrupted by both the breakpoint in the duplicated fragment and the insertion site in 7q31. It is the first association of IMMP2L gene to Tourette syndrome. 
Recent investigation by Bertelsen et al. further indicated that IMMP2L was one of the genes as a susceptibility factor in disease pathogenesis. Tourette syndrome is often accompanied by comorbidities such as attention deficit hyperactivity disorder and obsessive–compulsive disorder. Tourette syndrome has a complex etiology, and the underlying environmental and genetic factors responsible for this disease are still largely unknown.

References 

Enzymes
Genes